Tania Ortiz Calvo  (born October 30, 1965) is a former female volleyball player from Cuba, who won a gold medal at the 1992 Summer Olympics.

References

 Sports-Reference.com/Olympics Tania Ortíz Calvo (incorrect addition of accent)

1965 births
Living people
Cuban women's volleyball players
Volleyball players at the 1992 Summer Olympics
Olympic volleyball players of Cuba
Olympic gold medalists for Cuba
Olympic medalists in volleyball
Medalists at the 1992 Summer Olympics
Pan American Games medalists in volleyball
Pan American Games gold medalists for Cuba
Medalists at the 1991 Pan American Games